Yabaratti (ಯಬರಟ್ಟಿ) is a village in Belgaum district in the southern state of Karnataka, India.
Yabaratti is mainly known for its education. Most of the families here are educated and people are in different positions across the jobs.

References

Villages in Belagavi district